Negril Aerodrome  is an airport serving Negril in western Jamaica. It primarily serves the tourist resorts in the area.

Negril Aerodrome handled approximately 72,096 passengers in 2001. The airport has scheduled passenger service provided by International AirLink.

Facilities
There are no fueling facilities and the airport has no night flight operations.

Airlines and destinations

Passengers
The following table shows the number of passengers using the airport annually from 1997 through 2001.

References

External links
 

Airports in Jamaica
Buildings and structures in Hanover Parish